European route E 712 is a European B class road in Switzerland AND France, connecting the cities Geneva — Marseille.

Route 
 
 E25, E21, E62 Geneva
 
 E70 Chambéry
 Grenoble
 Aix-en-Provence
 E714 Chambéry

External links 
 UN Economic Commission for Europe: Overall Map of E-road Network (2007)
 International E-road network

International E-road network
Roads in Switzerland
Roads in France